The 2015–16 Houston Rockets season was the 49th season of the franchise in the National Basketball Association (NBA), and their 45th in the Houston area.

On November 18, 2015, coach Kevin McHale was fired in his fifth season as the Rockets coach after a 4–7 start to the season. J. B. Bickerstaff was named the interim coach.

The Rockets finished the regular season with a 41–41 record, finishing 8th in the Western Conference. The Rockets' season ended with a 1–4 loss in the First Round to the Golden State Warriors. Following the season, Dwight Howard left to sign with his hometown Atlanta Hawks.

Draft picks

Standings

Game log

Preseason

|- style="background:#fbb;"
| 1 || October 6 || @ Memphis
| L 89–92
| Trevor Ariza (12)
| Dwight Howard (11)
| Will Cummings (3)
| FedExForum12,826
| 0–1
|- style="background:#bfb;"
| 2 || October 7 || Dallas
| W 109–82
| James Harden (19)
| Clint Capela (14)
| McDaniels, Harden (5)
| Toyota Center16,839
| 1–1
|- style="background:#fbb;"
| 3 || October 11 || Orlando
| L 119–123
| Corey Brewer (20)
| Capela, Smith (7)
| Ariza, Beverley, Harden (4)
| State Farm Arena6,130
| 1–2
|- style="background:#bfb;"
| 4 || October 13 || @ Phoenix
| W 135–129 (OT)
| Terrence Jones (23)
| Clint Capela (10)
| Patrick Beverley (5)
| US Airways Center12,657
| 2–2
|- style="background:#fbb;"
| 5 || October 15 || @ Golden State
| L 101–123
| K. J. McDaniels (20)
| Chris Walker (9)
| Cummings, Beverley (6)
| Oracle Arena19,596
| 2–3
|- style="background:#fbb;"
| 6 || October 17 || Miami
| L 100–105
| Trevor Ariza (21)
| Terrence Jones (12)
| Terrence Jones (6)
| Toyota Center18,334
| 2–4
|- style="background:#bfb;"
| 7 || October 19 || New Orleans
| W 120–100
| James Harden (20)
| Clint Capela (12)
| Ty Lawson (5)
| Toyota Center16,678
| 3–4
|- style="background:#fbb;"
| 8 || October 23 || @ San Antonio
| L 86–111
| James Harden (17)
| Harden, Jones (8)
| James Harden (9)
| AT&T Center18,059
| 3–5

Regular season

|- style="background:#fbb;"
| 1
| October 28
| Denver
| 
| James Harden (22)
| Patrick Beverley (8)
| Harden, Lawson (6)
| Toyota Center18,240
| 0–1
|- style="background:#fbb;"
| 2
| October 30
| Golden State
| 
| Montrezl Harrell (17)
| Clint Capela (8)
| Harden, Lawson (5)
| Toyota Center18,142
| 0–2

|- style="background:#fbb;"
| 3
| November 1
| @ Miami
| 
| Marcus Thornton (21)
| Trevor Ariza (7)
| James Harden (7)
| American Airlines Arena19,600
| 0–3
|- style="background:#bfb;"
| 4
| November 2
| Oklahoma City
| 
| James Harden (37)
| Dwight Howard (8)
| Ty Lawson (11)
| Toyota Center17,224
| 1–3
|- style="background:#bfb;"
| 5
| November 4
| Orlando
| 
| James Harden (28)
| Dwight Howard (14)
| Ty Lawson (8)
| Toyota Center16,735
| 2–3
|- style="background:#bfb;"
| 6
| November 6
| @ Sacramento
| 
| James Harden (43)
| Clint Capela (12)
| James Harden (13)
| Sleep Train Arena16,983
| 3–3
|- style="background:#bfb;"
| 7
| November 7
| @ L.A. Clippers
| 
| James Harden (46)
| Dwight Howard (20)
| Ty Lawson (4)
| Staples Center19,361
| 4–3
|- style="background:#fbb;"
| 8
| November 11
| Brooklyn
| 
| Dwight Howard (20)
| Dwight Howard (17)
| Marcus Thornton (7)
| Toyota Center18,155
| 4–4
|- style="background:#fbb;"
| 9
| November 13
| @ Denver
| 
| James Harden (28)
| Dwight Howard (10)
| Ty Lawson (7)
| Pepsi Center16,113
| 4–5
|- style="background:#fbb;"
| 10
| November 14
| Dallas
| 
| James Harden (25)
| Clint Capela (10)
| James Harden (10)
| Toyota Center18,231
| 4–6
|- style="background:#fbb;"
| 11
| November 16
| Boston
| 
| Trevor Ariza (19)
| Dwight Howard (12)
| James Harden (5)
| Toyota Center17,005
| 4–7
|- style="background:#bfb;"
| 12
| November 18
| Portland
| 
| James Harden (45)
| Dwight Howard (19)
| James Harden (11)
| Toyota Center17,107
| 5–7
|- style="background:#fbb;"
| 13
| November 20
| @ Memphis
| 
| James Harden (22)
| Dwight Howard (15)
| James Harden (5)
| FedExForum17,555
| 5–8
|- style="background:#fbb;"
| 14
| November 21
| New York
| 
| James Harden (24)
| Clint Capela (14)
| James Harden (10)
| Toyota Center18,226
| 5–9
|- style="background:#fbb;"
| 15
| November 25
| Memphis
| 
| James Harden (40)
| Trevor Ariza (12)
| James Harden (5)
| Toyota Center18,143
| 5–10
|- style="background:#bfb;"
| 16
| November 27
| Philadelphia
| 
| James Harden (50)
| Dwight Howard (13)
| James Harden (8)
| Toyota Center17,306
| 6–10
|- style="background:#bfb;"
| 17
| November 29
| @ New York
| 
| James Harden (26)
| Clint Capela (11)
| James Harden (9)
| Madison Square Garden19,812
| 7–10
|- style="background:#fbb;"
| 18
| November 30
| @ Detroit
| 
| James Harden (29)
| Dwight Howard (10)
| James Harden (7)
| The Palace of Auburn Hills14,818
| 7–11

|- style="background:#bfb;"
| 19
| December 2
| New Orleans
| 
| James Harden (24)
| Dwight Howard (16)
| Harden, Lawson (6)
| Toyota Center17,339
| 8–11
|- style="background:#bfb;"
| 20
| December 4
| @ Dallas
| 
| James Harden (25)
| Clint Capela (10)
| James Harden (9)
| American Airlines Center20,339
| 9–11
|- style="background:#bfb;"
| 21
| December 5
| Sacramento
| 
| James Harden (31)
| Dwight Howard (18)
| James Harden (9)
| Toyota Center17,318
| 10–11
|- style="background:#fbb;"
| 22
| December 8
| @ Brooklyn
| 
| Marcus Thornton (32)
| Capela, Howard (9)
| James Harden (9)
| Barclays Center13,319
| 10–12
|- style="background:#bfb;"
| 23
| December 9
| @ Washington
| 
| James Harden (42)
| Harden, Howard (9)
| James Harden (9)
| Verizon Center16,041
| 11–12
|- style="background:#bfb;"
| 24
| December 12
| L.A. Lakers
| 
| James Harden (30)
| Dwight Howard (12)
| Ty Lawson (8)
| Toyota Center18,456
| 12–12
|- style="background:#fbb;"
| 25
| December 14
| @ Denver
| 
| James Harden (24)
| Dwight Howard (8)
| Patrick Beverley (8)
| Pepsi Center12,022
| 12–13
|- style="background:#fbb;"
| 26
| December 15
| @ Sacramento
| 
| James Harden (33)
| Clint Capela (9)
| James Harden (6)
| Sleep Train Arena17,317
| 12–14
|- style="background:#bfb;"
| 27
| December 17
| @ L.A. Lakers
| 
| James Harden (25)
| Dwight Howard (15)
| James Harden (6)
| Staples Center18,997
| 13–14
|- style="background:#bfb;"
| 28
| December 19
| L.A. Clippers
| 
| Dwight Howard (22)
| Dwight Howard (14)
| James Harden (6)
| Toyota Center18,212
| 14–14
|- style="background:#bfb;"
| 29
| December 21
| Charlotte
| 
| James Harden (36)
| Dwight Howard (9)
| James Harden (7)
| Toyota Center18,236
| 15–14
|- style="background:#fbb;"
| 30
| December 23
| @ Orlando
| 
| James Harden (31)
| Trevor Ariza (8)
| James Harden (7)
| Amway Center17,061
| 15–15
|- style="background:#bfb;"
| 31
| December 25
| San Antonio
| 
| James Harden (20)
| Dwight Howard (12)
| James Harden (9)
| Toyota Center18,319
| 16–15
|- style="background:#fbb;"
| 32
| December 26
| @ New Orleans
| 
| James Harden (25)
| Dwight Howard (9)
| Harden, Lawson (5)
| Smoothie King Center18,248
| 16–16
|- style="background:#fbb;"
| 33
| December 29
| Atlanta
| 
| Dwight Howard (30)
| Dwight Howard (16)
| James Harden (8)
| Toyota Center18,211
| 16–17
|- style="background:#fbb;"
| 34
| December 31
| Golden State
| 
| James Harden (30)
| Dwight Howard (13)
| Harden, Howard (5)
| Toyota Center18,313
| 16–18

|- style="background:#fbb;"
| 35
| January 2
| @ San Antonio
| 
| Dwight Howard (22)
| Dwight Howard (12)
| Patrick Beverley (7)
| AT&T Center18,652
| 16–19
|- style="background:#bfb;"
| 36
| January 4
| @ Utah
| 
| James Harden (30)
| Dwight Howard (13)
| James Harden (7)
| Vivint Smart Home Arena17,912
| 17–19
|- style="background:#bfb;"
| 37
| January 7
| Utah
| 
| James Harden (33)
| Clint Capela (10)
| Patrick Beverley (4)
| Toyota Center18,155
| 18–19
|- style="background:#bfb;"
| 38
| January 10
| Indiana
| 
| Harden, Howard (21)
| Dwight Howard (17)
| James Harden (9)
| Toyota Center18,133
| 19–19
|- style="background:#bfb;"
| 39
| January 12
| @ Memphis
| 
| James Harden (25)
| Dwight Howard (14)
| Jason Terry (6)
| FedExForum16,044
| 20–19
|- style="background:#bfb;"
| 40
| January 13
| Minnesota
| 
| James Harden (27)
| Dwight Howard (10)
| James Harden (11)
| Toyota Center17,115
| 21–19
|- style="background:#fbb;"
| 41
| January 15
| Cleveland
| 
| Dwight Howard (14)
| Dwight Howard (11)
| James Harden (5)
| Toyota Center18,320
| 21–20
|- style="background:#bfb;"
| 42
| January 17
| @ L.A. Lakers
| 
| James Harden (31)
| Dwight Howard (15)
| Harden, Lawson (5)
| Staples Center18,997
| 22–20
|- style="background:#fbb;"
| 43
| January 18
| @ L.A. Clippers
| 
| Dwight Howard (36)
| Dwight Howard (26)
| James Harden (8)
| Staples Center19,060
| 22–21
|- style="background:#fbb;"
| 44
| January 20
| Detroit
| 
| James Harden (33)
| James Harden (17)
| James Harden (14)
| Toyota Center17,203
| 22–22
|- style="background:#bfb;"
| 45
| January 22
| Milwaukee
| 
| James Harden (30)
| Clint Capela (9)
| James Harden (8)
| Toyota Center17,196
| 23–22
|- style="background:#bfb;"
| 46
| January 24
| Dallas
| 
| James Harden (23)
| James Harden (15)
| James Harden (10)
| Toyota Center18,142
| 24–22
|- style="background:#bfb;"
| 47
| January 25
| @ New Orleans
| 
| James Harden (35)
| James Harden (11)
| James Harden (8)
| Smoothie King Center15,688
| 25–22
|- style="background:#fbb;"
| 48
| January 27
| @ San Antonio
| 
| James Harden (20)
| Dwight Howard (8)
| Marcus Thornton (3)
| AT&T Center18,418
| 25–23
|- style="background:#fbb;"
| 49
| January 29
| @ Oklahoma City
| 
| James Harden (33)
| Dwight Howard (8)
| James Harden (7)
| Chesapeake Energy Arena18,203
| 25–24
|- style="background:#fbb;"
| 50
| January 30
| Washington
| 
| James Harden (40)
| Ariza, Harden, Howard (7)
| James Harden (11)
| Toyota Center18,320
| 25–25

|- style="background:#bfb;"
| 51
| February 2
| Miami
| 
| James Harden (26)
| Terrence Jones (7)
| James Harden (14)
| Toyota Center18,229
| 26–25
|- style="background:#bfb;"
| 52
| February 4
| @ Phoenix
| 
| Corey Brewer (24)
| Dwight Howard (16)
| Beverley, Harden (6)
| Talking Stick Resort Arena15,723
| 27–25
|- style="background:#fbb;"
| 53
| February 6
| Portland
| 
| James Harden (33)
| Dwight Howard (14)
| James Harden (8)
| Toyota Center18,308
| 27–26
|- style="background:#fbb;"
| 54
| February 9
| @ Golden State
| 
| James Harden (37)
| Dwight Howard (15)
| Patrick Beverley (7)
| Oracle Arena19,596
| 27–27
|- style="background:#fbb;"
| 55
| February 10
| @ Portland
| 
| James Harden (34)
| Dwight Howard (13)
| James Harden (11)
| Moda Center19,393
| 27–28
|- align="center"
|colspan="9" bgcolor="#bbcaff"|All-Star Break
|- style="background:#bfb;"
| 56
| February 19
| @ Phoenix
| 
| James Harden (27)
| James Harden (10)
| James Harden (7)
| Talking Stick Resort Arena17,102
| 28–28
|- style="background:#fbb;"
| 57
| February 23
| @ Utah
| 
| James Harden (42)
| Dwight Howard (16)
| Ariza, Beverley, Harden (4)
| Vivint Smart Home Arena18,132
| 28–29
|- style="background:#bfb;"
| 58
| February 25
| @ Portland
| 
| James Harden (46)
| Dwight Howard (13)
| James Harden (8)
| Moda Center19,393
| 29–29
|- style="background:#fbb;"
| 59
| February 27
| San Antonio
| 
| James Harden (27)
| Dwight Howard (14)
| Trevor Ariza (5)
| Toyota Center18,240
| 29–30
|- style="background:#fbb;"
| 60
| February 29
| @ Milwaukee
| 
| Dwight Howard (30)
| Dwight Howard (13)
| Trevor Ariza (11)
| BMO Harris Bradley Center13,214
| 29–31

|- style="background:#bfb;"
| 61
| March 2
| New Orleans
| 
| James Harden (39)
| James Harden (12)
| James Harden (7)
| Toyota Center18,226
| 30–31
|- style="background:#fbb;"
| 62
| March 5
| @ Chicago
| 
| James Harden (36)
| Dwight Howard (12)
| James Harden (8)
| United Center22,203
| 30–32
|- style="background:#bfb;"
| 63
| March 6
| @ Toronto
| 
| James Harden (40)
| Dwight Howard (11)
| James Harden (14)
| Air Canada Centre19,800
| 31–32
|- style="background:#bfb;"
| 64
| March 9
| @ Philadelphia
| 
| James Harden (29)
| Dwight Howard (18)
| James Harden (8)
| Wells Fargo Center15,237
| 32–32
|- style="background:#bfb;"
| 65
| March 11
| @ Boston
| 
| James Harden (32)
| Beverley, Howard (12)
| Ariza, Beverley, Harden (4)
| TD Garden18,624
| 33–32
|- style="background:#fbb;"
| 66
| March 12
| @ Charlotte
| 
| Corey Brewer (21)
| Dwight Howard (13)
| James Harden (10)
| Time Warner Cable Arena19,303
| 33–33
|- style="background:#bfb;"
| 67
| March 14
| Memphis
| 
| Donatas Motiejūnas (18)
| Dwight Howard (13)
| James Harden (8)
| Toyota Center18,226
| 34–33
|- style="background:#fbb;"
| 68
| March 16
| L.A. Clippers
| 
| James Harden (33)
| Michael Beasley (8)
| James Harden (8)
| Toyota Center18,304
| 34–34
|- style="background:#bfb;"
| 69
| March 18
| Minnesota
| 
| James Harden (29)
| Dwight Howard (11)
| James Harden (11)
| Toyota Center18,142
| 35–34
|- style="background:#fbb;"
| 70
| March 19
| @ Atlanta
| 
| Michael Beasley (30)
| Dwight Howard (17)
| James Harden (8)
| Philips Arena18,067
| 35–35
|- style="background:#fbb;"
| 71
| March 22
| @ Oklahoma City
| 
| James Harden (24)
| Dwight Howard (13)
| James Harden (16)
| Chesapeake Energy Arena18,203
| 35–36
|- style="background:#fbb;"
| 72
| March 23
| Utah
| 
| James Harden (26)
| Dwight Howard (8)
| James Harden (10)
| Toyota Center18,151
| 35–37
|- style="background:#bfb;"
| 73
| March 25
| Toronto
| 
| James Harden (32)
| James Harden (11)
| James Harden (13)
| Toyota Center18,230
| 36–37
|- style="background:#fbb;"
| 74
| March 27
| @ Indiana
| 
| James Harden (34)
| Dwight Howard (10)
| James Harden (8)
| Bankers Life Fieldhouse17,165
| 36–38
|- style="background:#bfb;"
| 75
| March 29
| @ Cleveland
| 
| James Harden (27)
| Dwight Howard (11)
| James Harden (8)
| Quicken Loans Arena20,562
| 37–38
|- style="background:#fbb;"
| 76
| March 31
| Chicago
| 
| James Harden (24)
| Dwight Howard (13)
| James Harden (8)
| Toyota Center18,244
| 37–39

|- style="background:#bfb;"
| 77
| April 3
| Oklahoma City
| 
| James Harden (41)
| Dwight Howard (9)
| James Harden (9)
| Toyota Center18,462
| 38–39
|- style="background:#fbb;"
| 78
| April 6
| @ Dallas
| 
| James Harden (26)
| Dwight Howard (16)
| Trevor Ariza (5)
| American Airlines Center20,108
| 38–40
|- style="background:#fbb;"
| 79
| April 7
| Phoenix
| 
| James Harden (30)
| Dwight Howard (7)
| Patrick Beverley (9)
| Toyota Center18,227
| 38–41
|- style="background:#bfb;"
| 80
| April 10
| L.A. Lakers
| 
| James Harden (40)
| Dwight Howard (13)
| James Harden (13)
| Toyota Center18,442
| 39–41
|- style="background:#bfb;"
| 81
| April 11
| @ Minnesota
| 
| James Harden (34)
| Clint Capela (10)
| James Harden (6)
| Target Center14,983
| 40–41
|- style="background:#bfb;"
| 82
| April 13
| Sacramento
| 
| James Harden (38)
| Clint Capela (17)
| Patrick Beverley (12)
| Toyota Center18,311
| 41–41

Playoffs

|- style="background:#fbb;"
| 1
| April 16
| @ Golden State
| 
| James Harden (17)
| Clint Capela (12)
| Corey Brewer (6)
| Oracle Arena19,596
| 0–1
|- style="background:#fbb;"
| 2
| April 18
| @ Golden State
| 
| James Harden (28)
| Dwight Howard (10)
| James Harden (11)
| Oracle Arena19,596
| 0–2
|- style="background:#bfb;"
| 3
| April 21
| Golden State
| 
| James Harden (36)
| Dwight Howard (13)
| James Harden (9)
| Toyota Center18,200
| 1–2
|- style="background:#fbb;"
| 4
| April 24
| Golden State
| 
| Dwight Howard (19)
| Dwight Howard (15)
| James Harden (10)
| Toyota Center18,200
| 1–3
|- style="background:#fbb;"
| 5
| April 27
| @ Golden State
| 
| James Harden (35)
| Dwight Howard (21)
| James Harden (6)
| Oracle Arena19,596
| 1–4

Roster

Salaries

Michael Beasley was signed on March 4, 2016 for the perforated league minimum.
Andrew Goudelock was signed on March 9, 2016 for the perforated league minimum.
Ty Lawson was waived on March 1, 2016 after appearing in 53 games for the Rockets.
Marcus Thornton was waived on February 26, 2016 after appearing in 47 games for the Rockets.
Chuck Hayes was waived on November 8, 2015 after appearing in just 2 games for the Rockets.

Source:

Player statistics

Regular season

|- align="center" bgcolor=""
| 
| 81 || 81 || 35.3 || .416 || .371 || .783 || 4.5 || 2.3 || style=background:#fbb;|2.0 || 0.3 || 12.7
|- align="center" bgcolor="f0f0f0"
| 
| 20 || 0 || 18.2 || .522 || .333 || .776 || 4.9 || 0.8 || 0.6 || 0.5 || 12.8
|- align="center" bgcolor=""
| 
| 71 || 63 || 28.7 || .434 || style=background:#fbb;|.400 || .682 || 3.5 || 3.4 || 1.3 || 0.4 || 9.9
|- align="center" bgcolor="f0f0f0"
| 
| 82 || 12 || 20.4 || .384 || .272 || .750 || 2.4 || 1.3 || 1.0 || 0.2 || 7.2
|- align="center" bgcolor=""
| 
| 77 || 35 || 19.1 || .582 || .000 || .379 || 6.4 || 0.6 || 0.8 || 1.2 || 7.0
|- align="center" bgcolor="f0f0f0"
| 
| 3 || 0 || 2.0 || – || – || – || 0.3 || 0.0 || 0.3 || 0.0 || 0.0
|- align="center" bgcolor=""
| 
| 8 || 0 || 6.3 || .450 || .111 || .750 || 0.3 || 0.5 || 0.8 || 0.3 || 2.8
|- align="center" bgcolor="f0f0f0"
| 
| 82 || 82 || style=background:#fbb;|38.1 || .439 || .359 || .860 || 6.1 || style=background:#fbb;|7.5 || 1.7 || 0.6 || style=background:#fbb;|29.0
|- align="center" bgcolor=""
| 
| 39 || 1 || 9.7 || style=background:#fbb;|.644 || .000 || .522 || 1.7 || 0.4 ||0.3 || 0.3 || 3.6
|- align="center" bgcolor="f0f0f0"
| ‡
| 2 || 0 || 12.0 || .500 || – || style=background:#fbb;|1.000 || 4.0 || 1.0 || 0.0 || 0.0 || 2.0
|- align="center" bgcolor=""
| 
| 71 || 71 || 32.1 || .620 || .000 || .489 || style=background:#fbb;|11.8 || 1.4 || 1.0 || style=background:#fbb;|1.6 || 13.7
|- align="center" bgcolor="f0f0f0"
| 
| 50 || 11 || 20.9 || .452 || .316 || .664 || 4.2 || 0.8 || 0.5 || 0.8 || 8.7
|- align="center" bgcolor=""
| ‡
| 53 || 12 || 22.2 || .387 || .330 || .700 || 1.7 || 3.4 || 0.8 || 0.1 || 5.8
|- align="center" bgcolor="f0f0f0"
| 
| 37 || 1 || 6.4 || .403 || .280 || .800 || 1.1 || 0.3 || 0.2 || 0.2 || 2.4
|- align="center" bgcolor=""
| 
| 37 || 22 || 14.8 || .439 || .281 || .642 || 2.9 || 1.1 || 0.5 || 0.1 || 6.2
|- align="center" bgcolor="f0f0f0"
| 
| 23 || 6 || 18.3 || .343 || .271 || .480 || 2.9 || 2.1 || 0.7 || 0.6 || 6.6
|- align="center" bgcolor=""
| 
| 72 || 7 || 17.5 || .402 || .356 || .818 || 1.1 || 1.4 || 0.7 || 0.1 || 5.9
|- align="center" bgcolor="f0f0f0"
| ‡
| 47 || 6 || 18.8 || .400 || .338 || .879 || 2.4 || 1.4 || 0.7 || 0.1 || 10.0
|}
‡Waived during season

Playoffs

|- align="center" bgcolor=""
| 
| 5 || 5 || 36.2 || .255 || .143 || .750 || 4.2 || 0.8 || style=background:#fbb;|2.6 || 0.2 || 6.6
|- align="center" bgcolor="f0f0f0"
| 
| 5 || 0 || 16.0 || .478 || .333 || .857 || 4.2 || 0.6 || 0.2 || 0.5 || 10.4
|- align="center" bgcolor=""
| 
| 5 || 5 || 25.8 || .270 || .214 || style=background:#fbb;|1.000 || 4.4 || 2.2 || 0.4 || 0.4 || 5.8
|- align="center" bgcolor="f0f0f0"
| 
| 5 || 1 || 15.4 || .259 || .100 || .875 || 1.4 || 1.6 || 0.0 || 0.2 || 4.4
|- align="center" bgcolor=""
| 
| 5 || 0 || 8.6 || .333 || – || .400 || 4.0 || 0.4 || 0.6 || 0.4 || 1.6
|- align="center" bgcolor="f0f0f0"
| 
| 2 || 0 || 5.5 || .500 || .000 || – || 1.0 || 0.0 || 0.0 || 0.0 || 3.0
|- align="center" bgcolor=""
| 
| 5 || 5 || style=background:#fbb;|38.6 || .410 || .310 || .844 || 5.2 || style=background:#fbb;|7.6 || 2.4 || 0.2 || style=background:#fbb;|26.6
|- align="center" bgcolor="f0f0f0"
| 
| 2 || 0 || 6.0 || .333 || .000 || .500 || 1.0 || 0.0 || 0.0 || 0.0 || 1.5
|- align="center" bgcolor=""
| 
| 5 || 5 || 36.0 || style=background:#fbb;|.542 || .000 || .368 || style=background:#fbb;|14.0 || 1.6 || 0.8 || style=background:#fbb;|1.4 || 13.2
|- align="center" bgcolor="f0f0f0"
| 
| 4 || 0 || 8.5 || .308 || .333 || – || 1.8 || 0.3 || 0.0 || 0.8 || 2.3
|- align="center" bgcolor=""
| 
| 5 || 4 || 19.6 || .432 || .444 || .471 || 5.2 || 1.0 || 0.8 || 0.4 || 8.8
|- align="center" bgcolor="f0f0f0"
| 
| 4 || 0 || 9.5 || .462 || style=background:#fbb;|.500 || .000 || 0.5 || 1.0 || 0.3 || 0.3 || 4.0
|- align="center" bgcolor=""
| 
| 5 || 0 || 24.8 || .342 || .316 || style=background:#fbb;|1.000 || 2.2 || 1.2 || 0.4 || 0.2 || 7.0
|}

Source:

Injuries

Transactions

Trades

Free agents

Re-signed

Additions

Subtractions

Awards, records and milestones

Awards

Records
 On March 30, Dwight Howard set a franchise record for free throws missed in a game, with 15 in a road victory over the Cleveland Cavaliers.
 James Harden set an NBA single-season record for turnovers with 374.  On April 7, he tied the previous record of 366, set by Artis Gilmore of the Chicago Bulls during the  season (the first season that individual turnovers were recorded), and in his next game, on April 10, he broke the record.

Milestones
 On March 18, Howard passed 11,000 career rebounds in a 116–111 victory over the visiting Minnesota Timberwolves.

References

Houston Rockets seasons
Houston Rockets
Houston Rockets
Houston Rockets